UFC 73: Stacked was a mixed martial arts (MMA) event held by the Ultimate Fighting Championship (UFC). It took place on July 7, 2007, at the ARCO Arena in Sacramento, California and featured a total of nine bouts: four on the preliminary card and five on the main card.

Background
In the main event, Anderson Silva put his UFC Middleweight Championship belt on the line against Nate Marquardt.

The card's other championship match had Sean Sherk defending his UFC Lightweight Championship belt against Hermes Franca.  Post-fight, the California State Athletic Commission announced that both fighters tested positive for performance enhancing drugs. Sherk was eventually stripped of the title.

Jason Gilliam was the third choice for Chris Lytle's opponent. Originally scheduled to compete was Jeff Joslin, who withdrew due to a training injury. His replacement, Drew Fickett, also withdrew later due to injury.

Jorge Gurgel was initially reported to be facing future WEC Lightweight Champion Jamie Varner at this event, but Varner was later moved to the WEC for a planned match at WEC 27. Gurgel would instead fight Diego Saraiva on this card.

Results

Bonus awards
After the event's conclusion, the UFC awarded $40,000 to each of the fighters who receive one of these three awards.

Fight of the Night:  Diego Saraiva vs.  Jorge Gurgel
Knockout of the Night:  Anderson Silva
Submission of the Night:  Chris Lytle

Purses
Purse amounts were provided by the California State Athletic Commission, and include amounts for show and win. The figures do not include any undisclosed bonuses:
Anderson Silva – $90,000 ($45,000 + $45,000 win bonus) def. Nate Marquardt – $24,000
Sean Sherk – $28,000 ($14,000 + $14,000 win bonus) def. Hermes Franca – $14,000
Tito Ortiz – $210,000 draw with Rashad Evans – $16,000
Antônio Rodrigo Nogueira – $200,000 ($100,000 + $100,000 win bonus) def. Heath Herring – $70,000
Kenny Florian – $16,000 ($8,000 + $8,000 win bonus) def. Alvin Robinson – $3,000
Stephan Bonnar – $32,000 ($16,000 + $16,000 win bonus) def. Mike Nickels – $5,000
Chris Lytle – $20,000 ($10,000 + $10,000 win bonus) def. Jason Gilliam – $3,000
Jorge Gurgel – $14,000 ($7,000 + $7,000 win bonus) def. Diego Saraiva – $3,000
Frank Edgar – $10,000 ($5,000 + $5,000 win bonus) def. Mark Bocek – $3,000
Total disclosed payroll: $761,000

See also
 Ultimate Fighting Championship
 List of UFC champions
 List of UFC events
 2007 in UFC

References

External links
Official UFC 73 website
UFC 73 at UFC.com

Ultimate Fighting Championship events
2007 in mixed martial arts
Events in Sacramento, California
Mixed martial arts in Sacramento, California
2007 in sports in California
Sports competitions in Sacramento, California